Paul Wormser (11 June 1905 – 17 August 1944) was a French fencer. He won a bronze medal in the team épée event at the 1936 Summer Olympics.

References

External links
 

1905 births
1944 deaths
Sportspeople from Colmar
French male épée fencers
Olympic fencers of France
Fencers at the 1936 Summer Olympics
Olympic bronze medalists for France
Olympic medalists in fencing
Medalists at the 1936 Summer Olympics
French civilians killed in World War II
French Resistance members
Resistance members killed by Nazi Germany
French people executed by Nazi Germany
People executed by Nazi Germany by firearm
Deaths by firearm in France
20th-century French people